Harold Lake may refer to:

Judge Harold Hamilton, fictional character played by Richard Hamilton (actor)
H. B. C. Lake, Canadian businessman and politician

See also
Harry Lake (disambiguation)